Iran participated in the 2009 Asian Indoor Games held in Hanoi, Vietnam from October 30, 2009 to November 8, 2009.

Competitors

Medal summary

Medal table

Note: Demonstration sports indicated in italics.

Medalists

Results by event

3x3 basketball

Men

Board games

Chess

Men

Women

Mixed

Esports

Open

Futsal

Men

Women

Indoor archery

Men's recurve

Men's compound

Women's recurve

Women's compound

Indoor athletics

Men

Women

Indoor kabaddi

Men

Kickboxing

Men

Women

Kurash

Men

Women

Muaythai

Men

Pencak silat

Men's tanding

Sepak takraw

Men

Short course swimming

Men

Vovinam

Men's performance

Men's fighting

Women's performance

Women's fighting

Wushu

Women's taolu

Women's sanda

Demonstration sports

Belt wrestling

Men's freestyle

Men's classic style

Ju-jitsu

Men's fighting

Women's fighting

References

External links
 Official Website

Nations at the 2009 Asian Indoor Games
Asian Indoor Games 2009
2009